The 2020 GT4 European Series is the thirteenth season of the GT4 European Series, a sports car championship organised by Stéphane Ratel Organisation (SRO). The season will begin at Imola on 25 July and will end at the Circuit Paul Ricard on 15 November.

Calendar
A 2020 calendar was announced on 29 July 2019 at SRO's annual press conference at the 2019 24 Hours of Spa. However, as a result of the coronavirus crisis SRO had to revise its schedule and an updated calendar was released on 15 May 2020.

Entry list

Race calendar and results
Bold indicates the overall winner.

Championship standings
Scoring system
Championship points were awarded for the first ten positions in each race. Entries were required to complete 75% of the winning car's race distance in order to be classified and earn points. Individual drivers were required to participate for a minimum of 25 minutes in order to earn championship points in any race.

Drivers' championship

Teams' championship
The two highest-scoring cars per Team will score points. Any other cars entered by that team will not score points towards the team title.
A car scores points depending on the category it is entered in (Silver, Pro-Am or Am). The number of points awarded in each category is dependent on the number of cars participating in that class.

See also
2020 French GT4 Cup
2020 ADAC GT4 Germany

References

External links

GT4 European Series
GT4 European Series
GT4 European Series